Hans Klein (1981–1944) was a German military aviator. The name may also refer to:
Hans Klein (politician) (1931–1996), German politician, member (1976–1996) and vice president of the Bundestag (1990–1996)
Hans Hugo Klein (born 1936), German politician, member of the Bundestag from 1972 to 1983